John Joseph Hainkel Jr. (March 24, 1938 – April 15, 2005), was a legislator from New Orleans, Louisiana, who died in office after thirty-seven years of service. He was the first person in his state and the second in United States history to have been elected as both Speaker of his state House of Representatives and President of his state Senate.

References

External links

1938 births
2005 deaths
Louisiana Democrats
Louisiana Republicans
Louisiana state senators
Members of the Louisiana House of Representatives
Politicians from New Orleans
Speakers of the Louisiana House of Representatives
De La Salle High School (New Orleans, Louisiana) alumni
Tulane University alumni
Tulane University Law School alumni
Lawyers from New Orleans
20th-century American politicians
Deaths from asphyxiation
20th-century American lawyers